The vinta is a traditional outrigger boat from the Philippine island of Mindanao. The boats are made by Sama-Bajau, Tausug and Yakan peoples living in the Sulu Archipelago, Zamboanga peninsula, and southern Mindanao. Vinta are characterized by their colorful rectangular lug sails (bukay) and bifurcated prows and sterns, which resemble the gaping mouth of a crocodile. Vinta are used as fishing vessels, cargo ships, and houseboats. Smaller undecorated versions of the vinta used for fishing are known as tondaan.

The name "vinta" is predominantly used in Zamboanga, Basilan, and other parts of mainland Mindanao. It is also known as pilang or pelang among the Sama-Bajau of the Tawi-Tawi islands; dapang or depang among the Tausug in Sulu; and balanda or binta in Yakan in Basilan. It can also be generically referred to as lepa-lepa, sakayan, or bangka, which are native names for small outrigger vessels.

Description
The vinta has a deep and narrow hull formed from a U-shaped dugout keel (baran) built up with five planks on each side. The most distinctive feature of the vinta hull is the prow, which is carved in the likeness of the gaping mouth of a crocodile (buaya). It is composed of two parts, the lower part is known as saplun, while the flaring upper part is known as palansar, both are usually elaborately carved with okil motifs. The stern has two upper extensions (the sangpad-sangpad) which either emerge from the back in a V-shape, or are separated by a space in the middle. The stern may or may not feature okil carvings like the prow. Vinta hulls are traditionally made from red lawaan wood; while the dowels, ribs, and sometimes parts of the outrigger are made from bakawan (mangrove) wood.

The hull is covered by a removable deck made of planks or split bamboo. It has a central house-like structure known as the palau. This is used as a living space especially for vinta which are used as houseboats by the Sama-Bajau. The palau can be taken down to convert the houseboat into a sailing boat. However, this is usually only done when absolutely necessary for vinta which function as houseboats. When traveling, vinta are usually paddled or poled in shallow and calm coastal waters, with frequent stops along the way for supplies. They only sail when crossing seas between islands in a hurry.

Vinta have two bamboo outrigger floats (katig) which are supported by booms (batangan). Large boats can have as many as four batangan for each outrigger. The floats are slightly diagonal, with the front tips wider apart than the rear tips. The front tips of the floats also extend past the prow and curve upwards, while the rear tips do not extend beyond the stern. Additional booms (sa'am) also extend out from the hull and the main booms. These provide support for a covering of planks (lantay) which serve as extensions of the deck.

Vinta are usually rigged with a rectangular lug sail locally known as bukay, on a biped mast slotted near the front section. These are traditionally decorated with colorful vertical strips of the traditional Sama-Bajau colors of red, blue, green, yellow, and white. The patterns and colors used are usually specific to a particular family or clan.

Smaller sailing versions of the vinta used for fishing are known as "tondaan." They are usually undecorated and lack the upper prow and stern attachments. They are rigged with a mast and a sail at all times, though a temporary palau can be erected amidships if necessary. Modern vinta are usually tondaan instead of the larger houseboats. Like other traditional boats in the Philippines since the 1970s, they are almost always motorized and have largely lost their sails.

Along with the balangay, lightly armed vinta were also used in the civilian squadrons of the Marina Sutil ("Light Navy") of Zamboanga City and Spanish-controlled settlements in Mindanao and the Visayas in the late 18th to early 19th centuries, as defense fleets against Moro Raiders.

Carvings
Vinta are usually carved with okil designs, similar to the lepa and djenging boats of the Sama people. The three most common motifs are dauan-dauan (leaf-like designs), kaloon (curved lines), and agta-agta (fish designs). All three are used in carving the buaya design of the prow. The hull of the vinta is decorated with one to three strips of curvilinear carvings known as bahan-bahan (meaning "bending" or "curving"), which are reminiscent of waves. In new boats, these designs can be painted with the same colors as the sails, but once the paint wears off, it is usually not repainted.

Reconstructions
In 1985 the vinta Sarimanok was sailed from Bali to Madagascar to replicate ancient seafaring techniques.

Zamboanga City also celebrates vintas in the annual Regatta de Zamboanga during the city's Zamboanga Hermosa Festival each October. The participants are usually Sama-Bajau fishermen from the coastal areas of Zamboanga. Many of these modern "vinta" however, are not vinta, but are other types of bangka (like bigiw) that merely use a vinta-patterned sail (often non-functional).

Other uses
"Vinta" is also the name of a Moro dance that commemorates the migration of Filipinos into the archipelago. In the dance,  dancers imitating the movements of the vinta (vessel) by balancing perilously on top of poles. PAREF schools in the Philippines have adopted the vinta as their symbol.

Gallery

See also

 Marina Sutil
 Londe (bininta), a related boat from the Sangir Islands
 Jukung, a similar outrigger boat from Indonesia
 Djenging
 Tempel (boat)
 Lepa (ship)
 Bigiw
 Paraw
 Outrigger canoe
 Balangay
 Sama-Bajau people
 Austronesian people

References

External links
 Vinta at Pacific Tall Ships
 Culture of Mindanao
 The Voyage for Love and Peace, from a dance company
 1930s images of vinta:
 Sailing near Zamboanga
 On the beach
 On the beach in a Moro village
 Multiple sailing vinta moored with visible rigging (at Malabang)
 Monohulls, outrigger canoes and possible vinta (at Malabang)

Moro people
Culture of Zamboanga City
Trimarans
Canoes
Exploration ships
Sailboat types
Outrigger canoes
Indigenous ships of the Philippines
Multihulls